Munich Animation is a German animation studio based in Munich, Germany. It produces traditional and CGI animation for feature films, short films, television, advertising and games. The studio's notable features include The Fearless Four and Help! I'm a Fish.

Filmography 
Note: This section only lists films entirely produced by the company.

 Der große Kater (2010)
 Wo ist Fred? (2006)

Traditionally animated films 
 The Simpsons Movie (2007)
 Pooh's Heffalump Movie (2005)
 Piglet's Big Movie (2003)
 Jester Till (2003)
 The Powerpuff Girls Movie (2002)
 Hey Arnold!: The Movie (2002)
 The Shark and the Piano (2001) - Short
 Help! I'm a Fish (2000)
 Tobias and His Lion (1999)
 The Fearless Four (1997)

References

External links 
 Jester Till (Munich Animation),  A compositing example excerpted from Jester Till.

Film production companies of Germany
German animation studios